Metalimnophila is a genus of crane fly in the family Limoniidae.

Distribution
New Zealand.

Species
M. alpina Alexander, 1926
M. apicispina (Alexander, 1923)
M. greyana Alexander, 1926
M. greyensis (Alexander, 1925)
M. howesi (Alexander, 1922)
M. integra Alexander, 1926
M. longi Alexander, 1952
M. mirifica (Alexander, 1922)
M. montivaga Alexander, 1926
M. nemocera (Alexander, 1923)
M. nigroapicata (Alexander, 1922)
M. palmata Alexander, 1932
M. penicillata (Alexander, 1922)
M. productella Alexander, 1926
M. protea Alexander, 1926
M. simplicis (Alexander, 1922)
M. spissigrada (Alexander, 1926)
M. unipuncta (Alexander, 1922)
M. yorkensis Alexander, 1926

References

Limoniidae
Nematocera genera
Diptera of Australasia